Blanca Castellon (born 1958 in Managua) is a Nicaraguan poet. She is the author of  Ama del espíritu (poetry, 1995), Flotaciones (poetry, 1998) and Orilla opuesta (poetry, 2000). She is also the winner of Instituto de Estudios Modernistas of poetry in  Valencia, Spain. She is currently Vice President of Centro Nicaragüense de Escritores (Nicaraguan Center of Writers).
She is married and has three sons.

External links
 Photograph of Blanca Castellon
 Blanca Castellon's Website

1958 births
Living people
20th-century Nicaraguan poets
People from Managua
Nicaraguan women poets
Date of birth missing (living people)
20th-century women writers